James Francis "Jim" Tunney (June 16, 1927 – September 22, 2010) was a Canadian dairy farmer and senator.

Born in Grafton, Ontario, Tunney was a fourth generation farmer from Northumberland County, Ontario. He was a director of the Dairy Farmers of Canada for 18 years, a director of the Dairy Bureau of Canada for 8 years, and a director of the Ontario Milk Marketing Board for 12 years. For 16 years, he was a Trustee with the Peterborough, Victoria, Northumberland & Clarington District Separate School Board.

He was summoned to the Senate of Canada for the Ontario senatorial division of Grafton on the advice of Prime Minister Jean Chrétien in 2001. A Liberal, he served for 1 year and 3 months until his mandatory retirement at the age of 75 in 2002.

References
 
 
 Death notice

1927 births
2010 deaths
Canadian farmers
Canadian senators from Ontario
Liberal Party of Canada senators
21st-century Canadian politicians